Blind is a South Korean television series starring Ok Taec-yeon, Ha Seok-jin, and Jung Eun-ji. It aired on tvN from September 16, to November 5, 2022, airing every Friday and Saturday at 22:40 (KST) for 16 episodes.

Synopsis
The series follows the story of ordinary people who have unfairly become victims to different crimes, their perpetrators, and those who try to catch the perpetrators.

Cast

Main
 Ok Taec-yeon as Ryu Sung-joon
 Ha Seok-jin as Ryu Sung-hoon/Im Sung-hoon
 Jung Eun-ji as Jo Eun-ki

Supporting

People around Ryu Sung-joon
 Jo Seo-hoo as Soo-young, Ryu Sung-joon's college friend

Ryu Sung-joon and Sung-hoon's family
 Choi Hong-il as Ryu Il-ho 
 Cho Kyung-sook as Na Gook-hee

People around Jo Eun-ki
 Jo Yeon-hee as Jo In-suk
 Kang Na-eon as Kwon Yu-na

People Muyeong Police Station
 Jung In-gi as Yeom Ki-nam
 Jung Eui-wook as Oh Young-guk
 Yoon Jung-hyuk as Kang Chang-wook
 Gyul Hwi as Na Dong-hwa
 Kim Min-seok as  Kim Seok-gu

Juror
 Kim Ha-kyun as  Kang Young-ki 
 Choi Ji-yeon as Kwon Gyeong-ja
 Cho Seung-yeon as Bae PD / Bae Cheol-ho
 Chae Dong-hyun as  Ahn Tae-ho
 Baek Seung-hee as Yeom Hye-jin
 Park Ji-bin as Jung In-seong/Jung Yoon-Jae
 Choi Jae-sub as Choi Soon-gil 
 Choi Gi-sa as Choi Jae-seop
 Oh Seung-yoon as Chef Charles

Others
 Kim Beop-rae as Baek Moon-kang
 Jeon Jin-woo as Jeong Man-chun 
 Jung Chan-woo as Koo Jung-sa

Extended
 Oh Min-ae as In Seong-mo
 Jung Ji-hoon
 Oh Se-young as Baek Ji-eun

Special appearance 
 Kim San-ho as Park Moo-hyeok

Release
Blind was initially confirmed to be released on OCN. However, it was later announced that the series would air on tvN's Friday and Saturday time slot instead, on September 16.

Viewership

References

External links
  
 
 

TVN (South Korean TV channel) television dramas
Korean-language television shows
South Korean mystery television series
South Korean thriller television series
South Korean crime television series
2022 South Korean television series debuts
2022 South Korean television series endings